DNI may stand for:

 Direct neural interface, a brain-computer interface
 Direct normal irradiance, a measure of the Solar irradiance striking a surface held normal to the line of sight to the sun
 Direct normal insolation, also known as direct insolation, a measure of the solar irradiance striking a surface held normal to line of sight to the sun
 Digital Network Intelligence, the NSA term for the collection of data from the Internet
 Director of National Intelligence, a Cabinet-level executive position that oversees the United States Intelligence Community
 Director of Naval Intelligence (disambiguation)
 Documento Nacional de Identidad (Spain), the Spanish national identity document
 Documento Nacional de Identidad (Argentina), the Argentine national identity document
 Dole Nutrition Institute founded by the Dole Food Company
 Do not intubate, an alternate term for "do not resuscitate"
 Do not install, a term sometimes used in Printed circuit board design to denote the omitting of a component
 Do not interact, a term used to deter people or a certain group of people from interacting with someone or something.
 Lower Grand Valley Dani language (ISO 639 code: dni)
 Wad Medani Airport (IATA airport code: DNI), an airstrip in Sudan

See also
 D'ni, a culture in the Myst series
 DNIS, a telephone service feature